Zwelidumile Geelboi Mgxaji Mhlaba "Dumile" Feni (May 21, 1942 – 1991) was a South African contemporary visual artist known for Katlego Lhuzwayoboth his drawings and paintings that included sculptural elements as well as sculptures, which often depicted the struggle against Apartheid in South Africa. Feni lived in exile and extreme poverty for most of his art career.

Early life 
Feni boy was born in the small farmstead of Withuis in Worcester, Cape Province, South Africa, to parents Geelbooi Magoqwana, a trader and evangelist, and Bettie Nothemba Mgxaji, a business woman. When he was young, Feni's family relocated to the Welcome Estate in Cape Town. His family were Xhosa people.

Career 

Feni's work often tied to the period of Apartheid in South Africa. He lived in self-imposed exile from 1968 to 1991 based between London, Los Angeles and New York.

He moved to the United States in 1978. He was an artist in residence at the Institute of African Humanities in Los Angeles, at the University of California.

The common man in present day South Africa is largely unaware of Dumile Feni's work and the Contemporary South African Art movement touts him as a 'Goya of Townships'. Dumile Feni represented much more than that.

Documentary 
In 2010, a documentary called Zwelidumile was released. It was created by South African filmmaker Ramadan Suleman.

Personal life 
Feni's first name, Zwelidumile, means "a person known all over the country."

Feni has a daughter named Marriam Diale.

Exhibitions

Solo exhibitions 
 1965: Transvaal Academy, Johannesburg, South Africa
 1966: Durban Art Gallery, Durban, South Africa
 1966: Gallery 101, Johannesburg, South Africa
 1966: Johannesburg Civic Theatre, Johannesburg, South Africa
 1966: Pretoria Art Museum, Pretoria, South Africa
 1966: Republic Festival Exhibition, Pretoria, South Africa
 1966: SA Breweries Art Prize Exhibition, toured South Africa
 1966: Trans-Natal, Natal Society for Arts, Durban, South Africa
 1967: Gallery 101, Johannesburg, South Africa
 1967: Transvaal Academy, Johannesburg, South Africa
 1968: Sketches from a Private Collection, Goodman Gallery
 1969: Grosvenor Gallery, London, United Kingdom
 1970: Exhibition from the Collection of Desmond Fisher, Goodman Gallery
 1970: The 51 Club Winter Art Exhibition, Goodman Gallery
 1975: South African Sculpture, Goodman Gallery
 1981: Black Art Today, Jabulani Standard Bank, Soweto
 1988: La Galleria, New York, NY
 1989: Portrait of Nelson Mandela for the Pathfinder Mural, New York, NY
 1990: Township Art from South Africa, Applecrest, New York, NY
 1991: Standard Bank National Arts Festival, Grahamstown, South Africa
 2010: Art on Paper, MOMO Art Gallery, South Africa

Group exhibitions 
 1966: Artists of Fame and Promise, Adler Fielding Galleries, Johannesburg, South Africa
 1967: São Paulo Art Biennial, Brazil
 1967: Sculpture South Africa, 1900: 1967, Adler Fielding Galleries, Johannesburg, South Africa
 1969: Contemporary African Art, Camden Arts Centre, London, United Kingdom
 1971: Gallery 101, Johannesburg, South Africa
 1972: Gallery 101, Johannesburg, South Africa
 1975: African Art from South Africa, Gallery 21, London, United Kingdom
 1977: Contemporary African Art in South Africa, Rand Afrikaans University, Pretoria Art Museum, University of Orange Free State, William Hamphrey Art Gallery (University of Fort Hare)
 1977: SANG (Cape Town Festival), Gallery 21, South Africa
 1982: Art towards Social Development: an Exhibition of South African Art, National Museum and Art Gallery, Gaborone, Botswana
 1983: United Nations Exhibition, Commemoration of Namibia Freedom Day, New York, NY
 1987: Unlock Apartheid's Jails, conference on children under apartheid, with Bill Cosby and the American Committee of Africa, Hyatt Hotel, New York, NY
 1988: Uhuru: an Exhibition of African American Art against Apartheid, City without Wall Gallery, Newark, NJ
 1988: Voices from Exile (Seven South African Artists), Washington, DC; Los Angeles, CA; Houston, TX; Philadelphia, PA
 2010: MOMO Art Gallery, South Africa

Awards 
 2003: Order of Ikhamanga in Gold, for excellence in the arts

Selected works and publications 
 Feni, Dumile, and Bruce Smith. Dumile: Artist in Exile, South Africa: Bruce Smith in association with Art on Paper, 2004.

References

External links 
 
 https://www.art-archives-southafrica.ch/DUMILE.htm
 http://www.pelmama.org/DUMILE.htm

1942 births
1992 deaths
South African painters
Recipients of the Order of Ikhamanga